William Varney may refer to:

William Varney Pettet (1858–1938), Canadian politician
William F. Varney (1884–1960), American politician
Bill Varney (1934–2011), American film sound mixer